The 19th annual Nuestra Belleza Mexico pageant was held at the Poliforum del Centro de Convenciones of Tuxtla Gutiérrez, Chiapas, Mexico on September 1, 2012. Thirty-five contestants of Mexico competed for the national title, which was won by Cynthia Duque from Nuevo León who later competed in Miss Universe 2013 in Russia. Duque was crowned by outgoing Nuestra Belleza México titleholder Karina González. She is the fourth Neoleonesa to win this title.

The Nuestra Belleza Mundo México title was won by Marilyn Chagoya from Veracruz who later competed in Miss World 2013 in Indonesia. Chagoya was crowned by outgoing Nuestra Belleza Mundo México titleholder Mariana Berumen. She is the first and only Veracruzana to win this title.

Lucero Montemayor from Nuevo León was designated by the Nuestra Belleza México Organization as Nuestra Belleza Internacional México 2013. She later competed in Miss International 2013 in Japan. She is the third Neoleonesa to win this title.

This year for the first time a contestant was elected by a virtual casting and after eleven years two events were held separately to select the two winners for the titles Nuestra Belleza México and Nuestra Belleza Mundo México, this was the fifth time in the history of the pageant.

The recognition "Corona al Mérito 2012" was for Ximena Navarrete, Miss Universe 2010.

Results

Placements

Order of announcements

Top 15
Nuevo León
Chihuahua
Nuevo León
San Luis Potosí
Guanajuato
Jalisco
Jalisco
Nayarit
Distrito Federal
Sinaloa
Baja California
Aguascalientes
Distrito Federal
Morelos
Chiapas

Top 10
Distrito Federal
Jalisco
Nuevo León
Nuevo León
Aguascalientes
San Luis Potosí
Jalisco
Morelos
Chihuahua
Distrito Federal

Top 5
Jalisco
Distrito Federal
Aguascalientes
Nuevo León
Nuevo León

Nuestra Belleza Mundo México
Two days before to the final competition was held the semifinal competition with a live show entitled "Nuestra Belleza Mundo Mexico" in which was announced the winner of the Nuestra Belleza Mundo México title Marilyn Chagoya from Veracruz who represented the country in Miss World 2013. All contestants competed in swimsuit and evening gown during the contest.

The Nuestra Belleza Mundo México pageant was held at the Poliforum del Centro de Convenciones of Tuxtla Gutiérrez, Chiapas, Mexico, on August 30, 2012 and was hosted by Mariana Berumen, Karina González and Jan. It was the 5th edition of the Nuestra Belleza Mundo Méxicmcontest and as an official separate pageant to choose Mexico's representative to Miss World. The Winner of this event does not compete in the final night competition.

Order of announcements

Top 5
Jalisco
Veracruz
Nuevo León
San Luis Potosí
Nuevo León

National costume competition
In this competition the contestants are not evaluated, only the costumes. It's a competition showing the country's wealth embodied in the colorful and fascinating costumes made by Mexican designers combining the past and present of Mexico.

For the Nuestra Belleza México Organization this event is very important because it discloses the creative work of the great Mexican designers and also selects the costume to represent Mexico in Miss Universe the next year. Also, some costumes are selected to represent Mexico in other beauty contests.

The winning costume designer receives the "Aguja Diamante Award".

 – "Guerrera Azteca"
 – "Águila Azteca" (Competed in Reina Hispanoamericana 2012)
 – "Cielito Lindo" (Competed in Miss Continente Americano 2012)
 – "Reina Roja: Herencia Maya de Palenque"
 – "Coyochauxtli"
 – "Orgullo Mexicano: El Rebozo"
 – "Friso Maya"
 – "Tesoros Mayas: Tumba de Pakal"
 – "Folklore Mexicano"

 – "Mesticismo Huichol"
 Estado de México – "Diosa Azteca"
 – "Jalisco en la Piel"
 – "Malacatera: Inigualable Tejedora de Algodón"
 – "Pasión Mexicana"
 – "Mujer Bravía" (Competed in Miss International 2012)
 – "Maravillosamente Mexicano" (Will compete in Reina Hispanoamericana 2015)
 – "Amazona del Totonacapan" (Competed in Miss Universe 2013)
 – "Artesanías Mexicanas"
 – "Yaxché, Ceiba Sagrada"

Special awards

Judges
They were the same judges at the Preliminary and Final Competition.
Karin Ontiveros – Nuestra Belleza México 2010
Alejandra Espinoza – Nuestra Belleza Baja California 2006, Nuestra Belleza Latina 2007 and TV Hostess
Macario Jiménez – Fashion Designer
Rubén Galindo – Television Producer
Daniel Arenas- Actor
Jordi Avendaño – Photographer
Agustín Arana – Singer
Lisardo – Actor

Background music
Opening Number: "Sexy and I Know It" by LMFAO
Intermediate: "Peligro" & "Te Fuiste de Aquí" by Reik
Intermediate: "Convénceme" & "La Cima del Cielo" by Ricardo Montaner
Evening Gown Competition: "Tan Sólo un Minuto" & "Tu me Cambiaste la Vida" by Río Roma
Crowning Moment: "Nuestra Belleza" (Official Theme)

Expected contestants

Virtual casting

For the only time in the history of the competition, a virtual casting was held for the girls who failed to become finalists in their respective states. Three finalists were chosen and the winner was elected by the fan votes, on July 20, 2012 was known who was the winner.

Replacements
 – Karla Ruíz was the winner of Nuestra Belleza Chiapas 2012. The Nuestra Belleza Turismo Chiapas 2012, Valeria Ruíz was who represented Chiapas in Nuestra Belleza México 2012. Karla Ruíz left the competition for health reasons, and who had symptoms of chickenpox that precludes their participation in the contest. Instead Valeria Ruíz took his deputy who joined activities with other state representatives days later.

Designates

 – Jaqueline Sauza
 – Lucero Montemayor
 – Briseyda Zazueta

Returning states
Last competed in 2009:

Last competed in 2010:

Withdrawals
 – Karla Ruíz

', '

Significance
Nuevo León won the Nuestra Belleza México title for the fourth time (before 1997, 1998 and 2005)
Veracruz won the Nuestra Belleza Mundo México title for the first time ever.
Nuevo León won the Nuestra Belleza Internacional México title for the third time (before 2007 and 2009) and was the Suplente/1st Runner-up for the third time (before 2003 and 2004).
This year there was a new change, for the first time a contestant was elected by a virtual casting.
Cynthia Duque's crown fell to the ground after she was crowned, suffering major damage.
After eleven years, returned the Final Competition to select to "Nuestra Belleza Mundo México".
For the first time Oaxaca has two representatives in the competition.
For the first time a State (Distrito Federal) has two Beauty Queens.
Tlaxcala returns to competition after three years (2009).
Guerrero returns to competition after two years (2010).
Jalisco was placed for the ninth consecutive year in the Top 5.
Aguascalientes was placed for the third consecutive year in the Top 5.
Jalisco and Nuevo León were placed for the tenth consecutive year.
Aguascalientes and Sinaloa were placed for the fifth consecutive year.
Distrito Federal was placed for the fourth consecutive year.
Morelos was placed for the third consecutive year.
Chiapas and Guanajuato were placed for the second consecutive year.
Veracruz returned to making calls to the semi-finals after two years (2010), Baja California and Chihuahua after three years (2009), San Luis Potosí after four years (2008), Nayarit after six years (2006)
States that were called to the semi-finals last year and this year failed to qualify were Baja California Sur, Durango, Estado de México and Sonora.
Chihuahua won Miss Talent for the second time (before 2009).
Nuevo León won Contestants' Choice and Miss Sports for the first time.
San Luis Potosí won for the first time a Fast-track, Miss Top Model.
Veracruz won for the first time a Fast-track, the Academic Award and Best National Costume.
The host delegate, Valeria Ruíz from Chiapas placed to semi-finals.
For the first time Ximena Navarrete and Alan Tacher hosted the pageant.
Baja California Sur (Diana Castro) and Colima (Mirna Parra) are the tallest delegates in this edition (1.82 m).
Distrito Federal (Natalia Serrano), Hidalgo (Ángeles Cuevas) and Querétaro (Ana Elisa García) are the shortest delegate in this edition (1.68 m).
Delegates from Colima, Chihuahua, Distrito Federal, Hidalgo, Guerrero, Morelos, Tabasco and Tlaxcala were elected by designation.

Contestants notes
 – Jessica Amor is the Reina de la Feria Nacional de San Marcos 2014.
 – Jeraldine González was selected to represent Mexico in Reina Hispanoamericana 2012 in Santa Cruz, Bolivia on October 25, 2012 where she won Miss Elegance.
 – Diana Castro was elected Reina Del Carnaval La Paz 2012 and Nuestra Belleza La Paz 2012, competition prior to the final state.
 – Cecilia Vázquez was Reina de Turismo Coahuila 2010 and today she is a Professional Model.
 – Mirna Parra was elected Reina Armería 2010 in Ciudad de Armería, Colima. In 2011 she competed in Reina de la Feria de todos los Santos Colima 2011. In 2013 she married, who was her boyfriend for several years.
 – Karla Ruíz left the competition for health reasons, and who had symptoms of chickenpox that precludes their participation in the contest. Instead Valeria Ruíz took his deputy who joined activities with other state representatives days later.
 – Valeria Ruíz was the Suplente/1st Runner-up in Nuestra Belleza Chiapas 2010 and Nuestra Belleza Turismo Chiapas 2012 in Nuestra Belleza Chiapas 2012.
 – Gabriela Prieto was part of Mexico's Next Top Model 2011, but she resigned from the competition because she missed her family. In 2012 she was elected Señorita Ciencias Políticas, UACH in her University. Competed in Reina Hispanoamericana 2013 where she was 3rd Runner-up and obtained the Miss Photogenic and Look Oster awards. Actually she is the new State Coordinator of Nuestra Belleza Chihuahua.
 Distrito Federal – Karen Padilla was born in San Juan de los Lagos, Jalisco but she has been living in Mexico City for several years. She is a Professional Model. She competed in Miss Continente Americano 2012 where she was a finalist in the Top 6 and won Miss Photogenic award.
 – Ana Victoria Sánchez was elected Reina del Club Campestre de Durango 2008.
 Estado de México – Laura Villalobos is a Professional Model, she works with Contempo Models in Mexico City.
 – Elisa Espinoza was elected Señorita Universidad de Guanajuato 2011. Competed in Miss Costa Maya International 2014, held in Belize on August 9, 2014 obtained the crown.
 – Fátima Hernández was Reina de la Expo-Feria de la Palmera 2010 in Zihuatanejo.
 – Ana Karen Siordia is a Professional Model, she works at Look Models Management in Mexico City.
 – Jacqueline Sauza studied at CEA. She received an award at the 2011 TVyNovelas Award as New Release. Also she is a Professional Model.
 – Chiara Leuzinger is of Swiss father and Italian mother.
 – Jasibi Suma was born in Guadalajara, Jalisco, but she has been living in Nayarit for several years.
 – Cynthia Duque competed in Miss Universe 2013, but she didn't place.
 – Lucero Montemayor was the Suplente/1st Runner-up in Nuestra Belleza Nuevo León 2012. Also she was Señorita UANL 2011. She competed in Miss International 2013, and failed place to semi-finalists. She currently works as a television presenter for ESPN Mexico.
 – Michelle Mendoza was the Suplente/1st Runner-up in Nuestra Belleza Oaxaca 2012. She was elected by Virtual Casting. Currently she lives in Monterrey where she is part of Las Noticias in Televisa Monterrey.
 – Veronica Sánchez was part of the contestants of Mexico's Next Top Model 2009 finished as 5th Runner-up. She is a Professional Model.
 – Briseyda Zazueta was the Suplente/1st Runner-up in Nuestra Belleza Sinaloa 2012.
 – Gabriela Saldívar was crowned  Nuestra Belleza Cajeme 2012  title she gave the right to participate in the final state of Nuestra Belleza Sonora 2012 which was the winner.
 – Alejandra García was a contestant in Nuestra Belleza Tabasco 2010.
 – Carla Tapia was born in Tepatitlan, Jalisco and competed in Nuestra Belleza Jalisco 2010. The same year, she was elected Miss Earth Jalisco 2010 and competed in Miss Earth México 2010 where she was a finalist in the Top 8. After time she moved to live in Tlaxcala where she was designated as Nuestra Belleza Tlaxcala 2012, marking the return of this State to the national competition after three years. Marilé del Rosario Señorita México 1989 the only Tlaxcalteca who participated in Miss Universe is supporting the state pageant. She represented Mexico at Miss Yacht Model International 2013 in Sanya, China where she was the 4th Runner-up.
 – Marilyn Chagoya was elected Nuestra Belleza Poza Rica 2012, competition prior to the final state. She competed in Miss World 2013, but she didn't place.
 – Marsha Ramírez was born in Guadalajara, Jalisco but she has lived for the last eight years in Yucatán. She is a local TV Hostess in Mérida. 
 – Artemisa Rivera was born in Aguascalientes and she competed in Reina Nacional de la Feria de San Marcos 2012. Competed in Miss Costa Maya International 2013.

Crossovers

Contestants who had competed or will compete at other beauty pageants:

Miss Universe
 2013: : Cynthia Duque

Miss World
 2013: : Marilyn Chagoya

Miss International
 2013: : Lucero Montemayor

Miss United Continents
2016: : Cynthia Duque (4th Runner-up)

Miss Continente Americano
2012:  Distrito Federal: Karen Padilla (Top 6)

Reina Hispanoamericana
 2012: : Jeraldine González
 2013: : Gabriela Prieto (3rd Runner-up)

Miss Costa Maya International
 2013: : Artemisa Rivera
 2014: : Elisa Espinoza (Winner)

Miss Yacht Model International
 2013: : Carla Tapia (4th Runner-up)

Miss Earth México
 2010: : Carla Tapia (Top 8)
 's representative

Mexico's Next Top Model
 2009: : Verónica Sánchez (5th Runner-up)
 2011: : Gabriela Prieto

Reina de la Feria de San Marcos
 2012: : Artemisa Rivera 
 2014: : Jessica Amor (Winner)

Nuestra Belleza Chiapas
 2010: : Valeria Ruíz (Suplente/1st Runner-up)
 2012: : Valeria Ruíz (Nuestra Belleza Turismo Chiapas)

Nuestra Belleza Jalisco
 2010: : Carla Tapia

Nuestra Belleza Nuevo León
 2012: : Lucero Montemayor (Suplente/1st Runner-up)

Nuestra Belleza Oaxaca
 2012: : Michelle Mendoza (Suplente/1st Runner-up)

Nuestra Belleza Sinaloa
 2012: : Briseyda Zazueta (Suplente/1st Runner-up)

Nuestra Belleza Tabasco
 2010: : Alejandra García

Reina del Carnaval La Paz
 2012: : Diana Castro (Winner)

Reina Armería 
 2010: : Mirna Parra (Winner)

Señorita UANL
 2011: : Lucero Montemayor (Winner)

Señorita Universidad de Guanajuato
 2011: : Elisa Espinoza (Winner)

Reina Turismo Coahuila
 2010: : Cecilia Vázquez (Winner)

References

External links
Official Website

.México
2012 in Mexico
2012 beauty pageants